Baduk  is a 1992 Iranian film. It was the debut feature of director Majid Majidi. The film deals with child slavery. The Persian term "baduk" refers to people, often children hired against their will, who carry smuggled merchandise from the border on foot.

Synopsis 
Jafar and his sister Jamal are separated from their parents after their father is killed in a well cave-in. While walking along the road, the siblings are kidnapped and sold into slavery. Jamal is dressed in fancy silks, destined to be the playmate of a Saudi prince. Jafar is drafted into a band of child baduki, bringing goods across the border between
Pakistan and Iran. Jafar escapes his captors, and engages the help of Noredin, a Pakistani baduk he has befriended. Together they work to free Jafar's sister, Jamal. The movie ends with a doomed act of bravery on the part of Jafar.

Background and critical response
The film was shot in Sistan and Baluchestan, an arid province in southeast Iran. Baduk premiered in January 1992, and was shown that February at the Tehran Fajr Film Festival. It was screened at the Director's Fortnight at Cannes in 1992, where it was considered a bold film from the Islamic Republic of Iran. Director Majidi ran into censorship problems after making this film.

Awards
 Best New Film, 10th Annual Fajr Film Festival
 Best Screen Play, 10th Annual Fajr Film Festival

Sources

 Sons Against Fathers. Article by Massoud Mehrabi 
 Synopsis from Allmovie, New York Times 
 Synopsis, Associação Brasileira Mostra Internacional de Cinema 
 International Festival of Films for Children and Young Adults, Iran

External links 
 

1992 films
1992 drama films
Iranian drama films
1990s Persian-language films
Films directed by Majid Majidi
Films shot in Iran
1992 directorial debut films